Transportation in Montana comprises many different forms of travel. Montana shares a long border with Canada, hence international crossings are prevalent in the northern section of the state; there are 13 road crossings and one rail crossing.

As the fourth-largest state in the United States, journeying from one side to the other takes a long time. The state has an extensive network of roads, including state highways, Interstate highways and U.S. routes. Rail connections are also well-established and were an important method of transportation in Montana since the 1880s. Within individual cities, public transportation includes rapid transit and high-frequency bus services.

For travel further afield, 16 airports are operational within Montana. Bozeman Yellowstone International Airport in Gallatin County is the busiest airport and there are another seven major airports and eight minor ones providing commercial services.

Roads

Prior to the creation of the state highway system and national numbered routes, a series of named auto trails traversed Montana and provided connections to other states. These included the Yellowstone Trail, Buffalo Trail, Vigilante Trail, and Green Trail.

Interstate highways
 of the Interstate Highway System, which serve as a thoroughfare for long-distance road journeys, is contained within Montana, and all of these are maintained by the Montana Department of Transportation (MDT).

Montana's Interstate highways are as follows:

U.S. highways

Eleven national U.S. routes are within the state, as seen in the list below:
 
 
 
 
 
 
  –  Kalispell Bypass
 
 
 
 

Two former national routes also ran through Montana before they were replaced by Interstates: US 10 and US 91.

In addition to these primary routes, Montana has a large number of state highways and smaller secondary routes. Speed limits on these roads are generally posted up to  along rural areas.

Vehicles
Vehicles themselves in Montana are required to display a Montana license plate on the back and front  by the Department of Motor Vehicles. Eight different primary plate designs have been issued since drivers were required to register their cars in 1913.

Bus service

The public transportation system in Montana is sparse as a whole, but several individual cities have local bus networks.

Intercity bus service 
Across Montana, the bus network does not have a large amount of intercity routes but Jefferson Lines goes to cities including Billings and Bozeman. Other carriers include Express Arrow.

Local bus service 
Some individual cities have their own bus network provided by a transit corporation.

Missoula is served by ASUM Transportation and Mountain Line; The Mountain Line public transit system runs twelve services around the city and the University of Montana. It is indirectly controlled by the local government which have appointed members onto the board of the transportation district.

Billings is served by MET Transit and Great Falls by Great Falls Transit.

All four agencies run routes with fairly frequent schedules allowing commuters quick movement around different areas of the cities.

Rail transport

Historically, the state was traversed east-to-west by the main lines of three transcontinental routes: the Milwaukee Road, the Great Northern and the Northern Pacific.

All passenger rail in Montana is provided by Amtrak. The Empire Builder serves twelve stations along the northern tier of the state between North Dakota and Idaho. Southern Montana last saw passenger rail in 1979 when the North Coast Hiawatha was discontinued.

The Class II Montana Rail Link operates  of track leased from BNSF within the state. A number of other small railroad companies also exist.

Defunct railroads
Many now-defunct historical railroads existed in the industrial period of the 19th and early 20th century:

Aviation

Commercial air travel is common in Montana and there are up to 71 public and private airports in the state. The largest is Bozeman Yellowstone International Airport, located eight miles northwest of Bozeman, an hour and forty minutes away by road from Helena.  The next largest is Billings Logan International Airport, near Billings, which has three runways and had over 388,000 enplanements in 2010.

The busiest domestic destinations from Montana are Denver, Colorado, Minneapolis, Minnesota and Salt Lake City, Utah, and the main airlines are Delta Air Lines and United Express.

See also
Plug-in electric vehicles in Montana
Transportation in Idaho
Transportation in North Dakota
Transportation in South Dakota
Transportation in Wyoming

References

 
Transportation planning